The 1975 Chatham Cup was the 48th annual nationwide knockout football competition in New Zealand.

Early stages of the competition were run in three regions (northern, central, and southern), with the National League teams receiving a bye until the later stages of the competition. In all, 123 teams took part in the competition. Note: Different sources give different numberings for the rounds of the competition: some start round one with the beginning of the regional qualifications; others start numbering from the first national knock-out stage. The former numbering scheme is used in this article.

One of the highlights of the competition was the performance of unfancied minnows Lower Hutt City, who progressed to the quarter-finals before being narrowly beaten by the competition's eventual winners Christchurch United.

The competition saw a change of sponsorship, with Lion Breweries taking over from Gillette. The competition was known as the Lion Chatham Cup for the rest of the decade.

The 1975 final
Christchurch United successfully defended their trophy, and also became only the second team to win the Chatham Cup/National League double. 

Blockhouse Bay were on top early, and looked like they might run away with the final, scoring through Mike Farac and Colin Shaw to lead by two goals after just ten minutes. Norman Moran reduced the deficit within minutes as the mainlanders came back into the match. With ten minutes to play, Gary Lake miscued while attempting to clear a cross into his own penalty area and the ball deflected into his own net to tie the scores.

In extra time it was Christchurch who applied all the pressure, and goals came to them through Kevin Mulgrew and substitute Mark McNaughton.

Results

Third Round

* Won on penalties by Nelson Suburbs (6-5) and Newlands Paparangi (6-5)

Fourth Round

Fifth Round

* Stop Out won 4-3 on penalties

Sixth Round

Semi-finals

Final

References

Rec.Sport.Soccer Statistics Foundation New Zealand 1975 page
UltimateNZSoccer website 1975 Chatham Cup page

Chatham Cup
Chatham Cup
Chatham Cup
September 1975 sports events in New Zealand